Oenochroma vinaria, the pink-bellied moth, is a moth of the family Geometridae. It is found in most of Australia.

The wingspan is 50–70 mm.

The larvae feed on Grevillea, Banksia and Hakea species.

References

Oenochrominae
Moths described in 1857